Barrington Broadcasting Group, LLC, headquartered in Schaumburg, Illinois was an American corporation focused on broadcast television, primarily in middle and small size media markets. Barrington owned or operated via duopoly twenty-four television stations, with the potential to reach 3.4 percent of households in the U.S.  It was owned by Pilot Group, a private equity firm.

History
Barrington Broadcasting was formed in May 2003 by a group of former Benedek Broadcasting executives. With Benedek  filed for bankruptcy and divested itself of all television properties in 2002, former President K. James Yager along with Senior Vice-Presidents Chris Cornelius, Keith Bland and Mary Flodin, pooled their talents to create a new company focused solely on medium and small market broadcasting.

The company began operations in January 2004 with its purchases of former Benedek stations WHOI-TV (Peoria, Illinois) and KHQA-TV  (Hannibal, Missouri/Quincy, Illinois) along with WEYI-TV in Vienna Township, Michigan. Barrington grew slowly at first, adding five more stations between 2004 and early 2006. A major expansion took place on March 27, 2006, when Raycom Media agreed to sell twelve of its network-affiliated TV stations to Barrington for $262 million. The sale was completed on August 11. In recent years, Barrington has been at the forefront of integrating social media and the internet into their on-air content.

In late 2012, it was announced that Pilot Group had put Barrington up for sale and that both Nexstar Broadcasting Group and Sinclair Broadcast Group were in final talks to acquire the full regiment of stations. On February 28, 2013, Barrington announced that it would sell its stations to Sinclair. The sale was granted FCC approval on November 18. The transaction was formally consummated on November 25.

Former Barrington-owned stations
Stations are arranged in alphabetical order by state and city of license.

Notes:
 (**) – Indicates that it was acquired by Barrington Broadcasting as its founding stations.
 (++) – Indicates a station acquired from Raycom Media in 2006.

Other Notes:
1 Owned by Tucker Broadcasting, Barrington operated WGTU under a Local marketing agreement.
2 Owned by Granite Broadcasting, Barrington operated WTVH under a Local marketing agreement.
3 Owned by SagamoreHill Broadcasting, Barrington operated WWMB under a Local marketing agreement.

Company Management
K. James Yager - Chief Executive Officer
Christoper H. Cornelius - Chief Operating Officer
Warren Spector, Chief Financial Officer
Mary L. Flodin - Senior Vice President of Finance & Administration
Keith L. Bland - Senior Vice President, Acquisitions & Development
James Clark - President & CEO, Barrington Interactive

Company Employees
Brian Bauer - VP & GM - Interactive Division

References

Defunct television broadcasting companies of the United States
American companies established in 2004
Companies based in Cook County, Illinois
Schaumburg, Illinois
Sinclair Broadcast Group
Mass media companies established in 2004
Mass media companies disestablished in 2013
2013 disestablishments in Illinois
2013 mergers and acquisitions